Town of Salem is an online multiplayer game with social deduction and strategy elements. It was developed and published by indie game developer BlankMediaGames, and released on December 15, 2014. Early alpha and beta versions were browser-based and free-to-play. On October 14, 2018, the game was released for iOS and Android mobile devices after a successful and long-supported Kickstarter fundraiser.

Town of Salem is reportedly the largest online version of the classic social deduction party game Werewolf, with over 5 million registered users as of June 2017.

Gameplay 
The game is inspired by the party games Werewolf and Mafia, in which players are secretly assigned roles belonging to teams of an informed minority and uninformed majority. Both teams seek to eliminate the other for control of the town. The chief strategy of the game is to survive and accomplish win conditions. Players use a combination of role abilities, teamwork, communication, deduction and deception to facilitate their victory.

In the base-game, there are three role alignments: town, mafia and neutral. Each player is randomly assigned a role, which determines their goal for the game. The mafia's goal is to kill all the townspeople, while the town's goal is to find and eliminate the mafia before they can do so. Neutral roles have their own unique goals which may or may not conflict with the town and mafia.

A match consists of rounds that cycle between night and day. Most roles have a unique ability which they can use during the night, such as protecting another player or learning their identity. The evil players may kill during the night, and all players have the opportunity to write notes in their will.

During the day, the wills of players that died the previous night are revealed. Then, players use what they have learned to accuse someone of being evil. If that player is found guilty, they are publicly lynched and their will is revealed. The game continues until one side achieves their win condition.

Development 
BlankMediaGames LLC was founded in 2014 by Josh Brittain and Blake Burns. A Kickstarter campaign began on February 14, 2014 to develop Town of Salem. After thirty days, the fundraiser raised $17,190 with a goal of $15,000. The game was released that year, and reached 800,000 active monthly users by 2016.

On September 13, 2014, the developers started a fundraiser for a Steam release, with a goal of $30,000. The fundraiser finished in 35 days, raising $114,197 from 7,506 backers. The Steam version was released on December 14.

As of March 2020, nine game modes are available on the base-game The game is for groups of 7-15 players, and features 50 different roles (including ones from The Coven expansion pack).

Ports 
On March 31, 2016, another Kickstarter fundraiser began after the release of a mobile beta version of the game. The fundraiser sought to support further development towards a finished mobile version. On September 28, 2018, after two years in development, a launch trailer for the mobile game was released on YouTube. The game, now using a Unity base code, was released free-to-play on the Apple App Store and Google Play on October 14. It featured an extensive overhaul of the UI to one that was more ergonomic, had more and improved animations, and better graphics.

On April 2, 2019 BlankMediaGames announced development of a Unity version of the web browser and Steam games due to the discontinuation of Adobe Flash Player in 2020. The opt-in beta version became available only on Steam on July 24. On October 28, 2019, the Steam Unity client was officially released. The formerly free-to-play Flash-based web version was still available for several months afterward. On May 28, 2020, the browser-based client was also updated to use the Unity engine.

Town of Salem – The Card Game 
On April 15, 2016, fundraising began for a card game version of Town of Salem. It raised $389,005 from 9,551 backers in 30 days, surpassing its of goal of $10,000.  The card game is more akin to the original Mafia party game, in which players close their eyes during nighttime and take turns using their abilities with the help of a human moderator.

The Coven 
On May 16, 2017, the expansion pack The Coven was announced. The expansion added a new faction, the Coven, fifteen new roles, and three new game modes. Two roles from the expansion, the Ambusher and Hypnotist, were eventually added to Classic on October 20, 2020. The expansion pack released in June 2017 for $10, with a 50% discount for players who purchased the game through Steam.

Data breach 
A data breach that affected over 7.6 million players of Town of Salem was disclosed in an email to security firm DeHashed on December 28, 2018. The breach involved a compromise of the servers and access to a database which included 7,633,234 unique email addresses. The database also contained IP addresses, passwords and payment information. Some users who paid for premium features also reportedly had their billing information and data breached. Investigative reporter Brian Krebs linked the hackers to Apophis Squad, a gang who made bomb threats against thousands of schools and launched distributed denial-of-service (DDoS) attacks.

Reception 
In 2020, PC Gamer named Town of Salem one of the best free-to-play browser games. They described it as difficult to explain, but easy to get the hang of. Matt Cox of Rock, Paper, Shotgun described the game as "an online hidden role game with no friends or eyeballs, and a whole load of bullshit." Cox went on to criticize the game for being too complicated, and said that the experience "feels empty" due to the lack of face-to-face interaction.

References

External links 
 

2014 video games
Android (operating system) games
IOS games
MacOS games
Multiplayer video games
Social deduction video games
Role-playing video games
Indie video games
Salem witch trials in fiction
Strategy video games
Asymmetrical multiplayer video games
Video games developed in the United States
Video games set in Massachusetts
Video games set in the 17th century
Video games with expansion packs
Windows games
Video games about witchcraft